Danylo Kanevtsev (born 26 July 1996) is a Ukrainian professional footballer who plays as a goalkeeper for Metalist Kharkiv.

Career
Kanevtsev was born in Kharkiv and is a product of the FC Metalist Kharkiv youth sportive system.

He spent his career in the Ukrainian Premier League Reserves club FC Metalist. And in February 2016 Kanevtsev was promoted to the Ukrainian Premier League's squad. He made his debut for Metalist Kharkiv in the Ukrainian Premier League in a match against FC Volyn Lutsk on 6 March 2016.

References

External links 
 
 

1996 births
Living people
Footballers from Kharkiv
Ukrainian footballers
FC Metalist Kharkiv players
Association football goalkeepers
Ukrainian Premier League players
Ukrainian First League players
Ukrainian Second League players
Erovnuli Liga players
FC Chornomorets Odesa players
FC Metalist 1925 Kharkiv players
FC Vorskla Poltava players
FC Dila Gori players
Ukraine youth international footballers
Ukraine under-21 international footballers
Ukrainian expatriate footballers
Expatriate footballers in Georgia (country)
Ukrainian expatriate sportspeople in Georgia (country)